Toda Station (戸田駅) is the name of two train stations in Japan:

 Toda Station (Aichi)
 Toda Station (Saitama)